The Staffordshire Football Association is the governing body of football in the county of Staffordshire.

References

External links

County football associations
Football in Staffordshire